Luke Turner (born 20 May 2002) is an Irish footballer who plays as a centre-back for Cliftonville.

Club career

Youth

As a youth player, Turner joined the youth academy of Shamrock Rovers.

Senior

Turner began his career at Aberdeen. After that, he had loan spells at Turriff United F.C., Wexford and Cliftonville.

On 25 June 2022, Cliftonville announced the permanent signing of Turner from Aberdeen following his impressive performances throughout the 2021-22 season. He helped them win the 2021–22 Northern Ireland Football League Cup. He also won that season's Young Player of the Year award.

Honours
Cliftonville
Irish League Cup: 2021-22

References

2002 births
Living people
Association football defenders
Association footballers from County Dublin
Cliftonville F.C. players
Aberdeen F.C. players
Wexford F.C. players
NIFL Premiership players